The Ancient City of Aleppo is the historic city centre of Aleppo, Syria. Before the Syrian Civil War, many districts of the ancient city remained essentially unchanged since its construction during the 12th to the 16th century. Being subjected to constant invasions and political instability, the inhabitants of the city were forced to build cell-like quarters and districts that were socially and economically independent. Each district was characterized by the religious and ethnic characteristics of its inhabitants.

Characterized by its large mansions, narrow alleys, covered souqs and ancient caravanserais, the Ancient City of Aleppo became a UNESCO World Heritage Site in 1986.

Many sections in the Al-Madina Souq and other medieval buildings in the ancient city were destroyed and ruined or burnt as a result of clashes between the Syrian Arab Army and rebel forces, in the Battle of Aleppo.

An estimated 30% of the Ancient City of Aleppo has been destroyed in the fighting.

Origins and founding

Lying on the left bank of Queiq River the ancient city was surrounded by a circle of eight hills surrounding a prominent central hill on which the castle (originally a temple dating to the 2nd millennium BC) was erected in the shape of an acropolis. The hills are Tell as-Sawda, Tell ʕāysha, Tell as-Sett, Tell al-Yāsmīn (Al-ʕaqaba), Tell al-Ansāri (Yārūqiyya), ʕan at-Tall, al-Jallūm, Baḥsīta. The wall has since mostly disappeared. It had nine gates (5 of them are well preserved) and was surrounded by a broad deep ditch.

The newer Jdeydeh quarters of the old city were first built by the Christians during the early 15th century in the northern suburbs of the ancient city, after the Mongol withdrawal from Aleppo. Jdeydeh is one of the finest examples of a cell-like quarter in Aleppo. As a result of the economic development, many other quarters were established outside the walls of the ancient city during the 15th and 16th centuries.

Historical timeline

Throughout its history, Aleppo has been part of the following states:

ca. 2400 BC–mid  23rd century BC, Kingdom of Armi
mid. 23rd century BC–mid 22nd century BC, Akkadian Empire
21st century BC–19th century BC, Eblaite Kingdom
ca. 1800 BC–1595 BC, Amorite Kingdom of Yamhad
1595 BC–ca. 1500 BC, Hittite Kingdom
ca. 1500 BC–ca. 1450 BC, Mitanni
ca. 1450 BC–ca. 1350 BC, New Kingdom of Egypt
ca. 1350 BC– early 12th century BC, Hittite Kingdom
11th century BC, Syro-Hittite kingdom of Palistin 
10th century BC, Syro-Hittite kingdom of Bit Agusi 
9th century BC–late 7th century BC, Neo-Assyrian Empire
early 6th century BC–mid-6th century BC, Chaldean Empire
ca. 550 BC–ca. 350 BC, Persian Achaemenid Empire
333 BC–312 BC, Macedonian Empire
312 BC–88 BC, Seleucid Empire
88 BC–64 BC, Armenian Empire
64 BC–27 BC, Roman Republic
27 BC–395 AD, Roman Empire
476–608, Byzantine Empire
608–622, Sassanid Persia
622–637, Byzantine Empire (restored)
637–661, Rashidun Caliphate
661–750, Umayyad Caliphate

750–878, Abbasid Caliphate
878–905, Tulunids
905–941, Abbasid Caliphate (restored)
941–944, Ikhshidids
944–1003, Hamdanids
1003–1038, Fatimid Caliphate
1038–1080, Mirdasids
1080–1086, Uqaylids
1086–1118, Seljuq Empire
1118–1128, Artuqids
1128–1183, Zengids
1183–1260, Ayyubids
1260 March–October, Mongol Empire
1260–1400, Mamluk Sultanate
1400 Timurid Empire
1400–1516, Mamluk Sultanate (restored)
1516–1918, Ottoman Empire
1920 March–July, Arab Kingdom of Syria
1920–1924, State of Aleppo under the French Mandate
1924–1946, French Mandate of Syria
1946–1958, Syrian Republic
1958–1961, United Arab Republic
1961–present, Syrian Arab Republic

Pre-history and pre-classical era

Aleppo has scarcely been touched by archaeologists, since the modern city occupies its ancient site.

Early Bronze Age
Aleppo appears in historical records as an important city much earlier than Damascus. The first record of Aleppo may be from the third millennium BC if the identification of Aleppo as Armi, a city-state closely related to Ebla is correct. Armi has also been identified with the modern Tell Bazi. Giovanni Pettinato describes Armi as Ebla's alter ego. Naram-Sin of Akkad (or his grandfather Sargon) destroyed both Ebla and Arman in the 23rd century BC.

Middle Bronze Age
In the Old Babylonian period, Aleppo's name appears as Ḥalab (Ḥalba) for the first time. Aleppo was the capital of the important Amorite dynasty of Yamḥad. The kingdom of Yamḥad (ca. 1800-1600 BC), alternatively known as the 'land of Ḥalab,' was the most powerful in the Near East at the time.

Yamḥad was destroyed by the Hittites under Mursilis I in the 16th century BC. However, Aleppo soon resumed its leading role in Syria when the Hittite power in the region waned due to internal strife.

Late Bronze Age
Taking advantage of the power vacuum in the region, Parshatatar, king of the Hurrian kingdom of Mitanni, conquered Aleppo in the 15th century BC. Subsequently, Aleppo found itself on the frontline in the struggle between  the Mitanni and the Hittites and Egypt.

The Hittite Suppiluliumas I permanently defeated Mitanni and conquered Aleppo in the 14th century BC. Aleppo had cultic importance to the Hittites for being the center of worship of the Storm-God.

Iron Age 
When the Hittite kingdom collapsed in the 12th century BC, Aleppo became part of the Syro-Hittite kingdom of Palistin, then the Aramaean Syro-Hittite kingdom of Bit Agusi (which had its capital at Arpad), it stayed part of that kingdom until conquered by the Assyrians In the 9th century BC, and became part of the Neo-Assyrian Empire until the late 7th century BC, before passing through the hands of the Neo-Babylonians and the Achamenid Persians.

Classical antiquity 
Alexander the Great took over the city in 333 BC. Seleucus Nicator established a Hellenic settlement in the site between 301–286 BC. He called it Beroea (Βέροια), after Beroea in Macedon.

Northern Syria was the centre of gravity of the Hellenistic colonizing activity, and therefore of Hellenistic culture in the Seleucid Empire. As did other Hellenized cities of the Seleucid kingdom, Beroea probably enjoyed a measure of local autonomy, with a local civic assembly or  composed of free Hellenes.

Beroea remained under Seleucid rule for nearly 300 years until the last holdings of the Seleucid dynasty were handed over to Pompey in 64 BC, at which time they became a Roman province. Rome's presence afforded relative stability in northern Syria for over three centuries. Although the province was administered by a legate from Rome, Rome did not impose its administrative organization on the Greek-speaking ruling class.

Beroea is mentioned in 2 Macc. 13:3.

Medieval period and the expansion of the city

The Sassanid King Khosrow I pillaged and burned Aleppo in 540 CE. Later on, the Sassanid Persians invaded Syria briefly in the early 7th century. Soon after Aleppo fell to Arabs under Khalid ibn al-Walid in 637 CE. In 944 CE, it became the seat of an independent Emirate under the Hamdanid prince Sayf al-Daula, and enjoyed a period of great prosperity.

On 9 August 1138 CE, a deadly earthquake ravaged the city and the surrounding area. Although estimates from this time are very unreliable, it is believed that 230,000 people died, making it the fifth deadliest earthquake in recorded history.

After Tamerlane invaded Aleppo in 1400 and destroyed it, the Christians migrated out of the city walls and established their own cell in 1420, at the northwestern suburbs of the city, thus founding the quarters of Jdeydeh. The inhabitants of Jdeydeh were mainly brokers who facilitated trade between foreign traders and local merchants. Many other districts were built outside the historic walls during the 15th and 16th centuries.

Mention is made of the city, by one of the witches, in William Shakespeare's Macbeth, written between 1603 CE and 1607 CE.

Main sights
Aleppo is characterized by mixed architectural styles, having been ruled, among the other, by Romans, Byzantines, Seljuqs,  Mamluks and Ottomans.

Various types of 13th and 14th centuries constructions, such as caravanserais, caeserias, Quranic schools, hammams and religious buildings are found in the old city. The quarters of Jdeydeh district are home to numerous 16th and 17th-century houses of the  Aleppine bourgeoisie, featuring   stone engravings.

Souqs and Khans

The city's strategic trading position attracted settlers of all races and beliefs who wished to take advantage of the commercial roads that met in Aleppo from as far as China and Mesopotamia to the east, Europe to the west, and the Fertile Crescent and Egypt to the south.

Al-Madina Souq, as it is locally known, is an active trade centre for imported luxury goods, such as raw silk from Iran, spices and dyes from India, and coffee from Damascus. Souq al-Madina is also home to local products such as wool, agricultural products and soap. Most of the souqs  date back to the 14th century and are named after various professions and crafts, hence the wool souq, the copper souq, and so on. Aside from trading, the souq accommodated the traders and their goods in khans (caravanserais) and scattered in the souq. Other types of small market-places were called caeserias (قيساريات). Caeserias are smaller than khans in their sizes and functioned as workshops for craftsmen. Most of the khans took their names after their location in the souq and function, and are characterized with their beautiful façades and entrances with fortified wooden doors.

The most significant khans within and along the covered area of Souq al-Madina are: Khan al-Qadi from 1450, Khan al-Saboun from the early 16th century, Khan al-Nahhaseen from 1539, Khan al-Shouneh from 1546, Khan al-Jumrok from 1574, Souq Khan al-Wazir from 1682, Souq al-Farrayin, Souq al-Dira, Souq al-Hiraj, Souq al-Attarine, Souq az-Zirb, Souq Marcopoli, Souq as-Siyyagh, The Venetians' Khan,*Souq Khan al-Harir from the second half of the 16th century, Suweiqa, etc.

Other traditional souqs and khans in Jdeydeh quarter (outside the walled city):
Souq al-Hokedun or "Khan al-Quds". Hokedun means "the spiritual house" in Armenian, as it was built to serve as a settlement for the Armenian pilgrims on their way to Jerusalem. The old part of the Hokedun dates back to the late 15th and early 16th centuries while the newer part was built during the 17th century. Nowadays, it is turned into a big souq with a large number of stores specialized in garment trade.
Souq as-Souf or the wool market, located at Salibeh street, surrounded with the old churches of the quarter.
Bawabet al-Qasab, a trade centre for wooden products.

Historic buildings
The most significant historic buildings of the ancient city include:

The Great Mosque of Aleppo (Arabic: جَـامِـع حَـلَـب الْـكَـبِـيْـر‎, Jāmi‘ Ḥalab al-Kabīr) is the largest and one of the oldest mosques in the city of Aleppo, Syria. It is located in al-Jalloum district of the Ancient City of Aleppo, a World Heritage Site, near the entrance to Al-Madina Souq. The mosque is purportedly home to the remains of Zechariah, the father of John the Baptist, both of whom are revered in Islam[5][6] and Christianity.[7] It was built in the beginning of the 8th century CE. However, the current building dates back to the 11th through 14th centuries. The minaret in the mosque was built in 1090,[8] and was destroyed during fighting in the Syrian Civil War in April 2013.[9]
Recent excavations unearthed a temple and 25 statues dating back to the first millennium BC. Many of the current structures date from the 13th century. The Citadel was extensively damaged by earthquakes, notably during the 1822 Aleppo earthquake.
Al-Matbakh al-Ajami, an early 12th-century palace located near the citadel, built by the Zengid emir Majd ad-Din bin ad-Daya. The building was renovated during the 15th century. It was the home of the Popular Traditions Museum between 1967–1975.
Al-Shibani Church-School of the 12th century, an old church and school of the Franciscan Missionaries of Mary located in the old city, currently used as a cultural centre.
Khanqah al-Farafira, a 13th-century sufi monastery built in 1237 by Dayfa Khatun.
Bimaristan Arghun al-Kamili, an asylum functioned from 1354 until the early 20th century.
Dar Rajab Pasha, a large mansion built during the 16th century near al-Khandaq street. During the first decade of the 21st century, the house was renovated and turned into an important cultural centre with a nearby large theatre hall.
Junblatt Palace, built during the 2nd half of the 16th century by the emir of Kurds in Aleppo and the founder of the Janpolad (Jumblatt) family; Janpolad bek ibn Qasim.
Beit Marrash, an old Aleppine mansion located in al-Farafira quarter, built at the end of the 18th century by the Marrash family.
Bab al-Faraj Clock Tower, built in 1898–1899 by the Austrian architect Chartier.
Grand Serail d'Alep, the former seat of the governor of Aleppo, built during the 1920s and opened in 1933.
National Library of Aleppo, built during the 1930s and opened in 1945.
The most significant historic buildings of Jdeydeh Christian quarter include:
Beit Wakil, an Aleppine mansion built in 1603, with unique wooden decorations. One of its decorations was taken to Berlin and exhibited in Pergamon Museum, known as the Aleppo Room.
Beit Ghazaleh, an old 17th-century mansion characterized with fine decorations, carved by the Armenian sculptor Khachadur Bali in 1691. It was used as an Armenian elementary school during the 20th century.
Dar Zamaria, built at the end of the 17th century and owned by Zamaria family since the early 18th century. Nowadays, the house is turned into a boutique hotel.
Beit Achiqbash, an old Aleppine house built in 1757. The building is home to the Popular Traditions Museum since 1975, showing fine decorations of the Aleppine art.
Dar Basile, an early 18th-century Aleppine house, operating as a private school since 2001.
Beit Dallal or Dallal House, built in 1826 on the place of an old church and a monastery, nowadays operating as a boutique hotel.

Madrasas

Al-Halawiyah Madrasa, built in 1124 on the site of Aleppo's 5th century Great Byzantine Cathedral of Saint Helena, where, according to tradition, a Roman temple once stood. Saint Helena, mother of Constantine the Great, built a great Byzantine cathedral here. When the Crusaders were pillaging the surrounding countryside, the city's chief judge converted the cathedral into a mosque. In 1149, Nur al-Din converted it into a madrasah; an Islamic-religious school. Nowadays, the 6th century Byzantine columns of the old cathedral can be seen in the hall.
Al-Muqaddamiyah Madrasa, located in the Khan al-Tutun alley, was originally a church before 1123. It was converted into a mosque by the judge of Aleppo Ibn-Khashab, then into a madrasah in 1168 by Izz Eddin Abdal Malek al-Muqadam during Nur al-Din's reign. It is the oldest operating madrasah in Aleppo.
Al-Shadbakhtiyah Madrasa, one of the earliest preserved Ayyubid madrasas, built in 1193 by Jamal al-Din Shadbakht, a freed slave of Zengid ruler Nur al-Din.
Al-Zahiriyah Madrasa, built in 1217 outside the city walls to the south of Bab al-Maqam, by Az-Zahir Ghazi.
Al-Sultaniyah Madrasa, begun by Aleppo governor Az-Zahir Ghazi and completed between 1223–1225 by his son Malek al-Aziz Mohammed. The building is most famous for the mirhab of the prayer room. It contains the tomb of sultan Malik al-Zaher the son of Ayyubid Sultan Saladin.
Al-Firdaws Madrasa, defined as "the most beautiful of the mosques of Aleppo". It was built outside the city walls to the southwest of Bab al-Maqam gate, by Dayfa Khatun; the widow of governor Az-Zahir Ghazi in 1235–1236, then regent for the Ayyubid ruler An-Nasir Yusuf. It is known for its large iwan (courtyard) with a pool in the middle surrounded by arches and ancient columns, sporting capitals with a honeycomb pattern. The same style characterizes the domes of the prayer hall. The mihrab is made of veined white marble, red porphyry and green diorite.
Al-Kamiliyah Madrasa, built between 1230–37 outside the city walls by Fatima Khatun daughter of Ayyubid Sultan al-Malik al-Kamil.
Al-Sharafiyah Madrasa, located to the northeast of the Great Mosque, founded by Abd al-Rahim ibn al-'Ajami and his son Sharaf al-Din 'Abdul Rahman in 1242.
Al-Turantaiyah Madrasa, located outside the city walls to the east of Bab al-Nairab, built between 1241–51 by the Aleppine historian Ibn al-Udaym.
Al-Ahmadiyah Madrasa, opened in 1724 in al-Jalloum district. It has an architectural style of Tekyes structures.
Al-Uthmaniyah Madrasa, located near Bab al-Nasr, founded by the Ottoman pasha Al-Duraki in 1730, and was originally named Madrasa Ridaiya.

Places of worship

Al-Shuaibiyah Mosque, also known as al-Omari, al-Tuteh and al-Atras mosque, is the oldest mosque in Aleppo, built in 637. It absorbed the ancient Roman triumphal arch, which once marked the beginning of the decumanus. The building was entirely renovated in 1146 and 1401. It is known for its 12th century kufic inscriptions and decorations.
Great Mosque of Aleppo (Jāmi‘ Bani Omayya al-Kabīr), founded c. 715 by Umayyad caliph Walid I and most likely completed by his successor Sulayman. The building contains a tomb associated with Zachary, father of John the Baptist. Construction of the present structure for Nur al-Din commenced in 1158. However, it was damaged during the Mongol invasion of 1260, and was rebuilt. The  tower (described as "the principal monument of medieval Syria") was erected in 1090–1092 under the first Seljuk sultan, Tutush I. It has four façades with different styles.
Al-Qaiqan Mosque ("Mosque of the Crows") of the 12th century, decorated with two ancient columns in basalt at the entrance. On the walls of the mosque, a stone block with an Anatolian hieroglyphs inscription could be seen.
Altun Bogha Mosque of the Mamluk era, built in 1318.
Al-Sahibiyah Mosque of 1350, built adjacent to Khan al-Wazir.
Al-Tawashi Mosque built in 1398 and restored in 1537. It has a great façade decorated with colonnettes.
Al-Otrush Mosque, built in 1398 in Mamluk style. It is famous for its decorated façade and the entrance which is topped with traditional Islamic muqarnas. It was restored in 1922.
Al-Saffahiyah Mosque, erected in 1425 and partly renovated in 1925. It is famous for its preciously decorated octagonal minaret.
Khusruwiyah Mosque completed in 1547, designed by the famous Ottoman architect Mimar Sinan.
Al-Adiliyah Mosque, built in 1557 by the Ottoman governor of Aleppo Muhammed Pasha. It has a prayer hall preceded by an arcade, with a dome, a mihrab with local faience tiles.
The old church of the Holy Mother of God of the Armenian Apostolic Church at Jdeydeh quarter, built before 1429.
The Forty Martyrs Armenian Apostolic cathedral of 1429, located in Jdeydeh quarter.
Mar Assia al-Hakim Church Syrian Catholic church of the 15th century in Jdeydeh.
The Dormition of Our Lady Greek Orthodox church of the 15th century in Jdeydeh.
 Churches of Jdeydeh Christian quarter such as the Maronite Saint Elias Cathedral, the Armenian Catholic Cathedral of Our Mother of Reliefs and the Melkite Greek Catholic Cathedral of Virgin Mary.
The Central Synagogue of Aleppo or al-Bandara synagogue, completed as early as the 9th century by the efforts of the Jewish community. The synagogue was ruined several times until 1428 when it was restored. The Jewish quarter collapsed during the 1822 Aleppo earthquake. Recently, the building was renovated by the efforts of Aleppine Jewish migrants in United States.

Gates

These are, clockwise from the north-east of the citadel:
 Bab al-Hadid (Iron Gate)
 Bab al-Ahmar (Red Gate, completely ruined)
 Bab al-Nairab (Gate of Nairab, completely ruined)
 Bab al-Maqam (Gate of the Shrine)
 Bab Qinnasrin (Gate of Qinnasrin)
 Bab Antakeya (Gate of Antioch)
 Bāb Jnēn (Gate of Gardens, completely ruined)
 Bab al-Faraj (Gate of Deliverance, completely ruined)
 Bab al-Nasr (Victory Gate, partially ruined)

Hammams

Aleppo was home to 177 hammams during the medieval period, until the Mongol invasion when many vital structures in the city were destroyed. Nowadays, roughly 18 hammams are operating in the old city.
Hammam al-Sultan built in 1211 by Az-Zahir Ghazi.
Hammam al-Nahhasin built during the 12th century near Khan al-Nahhasin.
Hammam Bab al-Ahmar built by Ottomans.
Hammam al-Bayadah of the Mamluk era built in 1450.
Hammam Yalbugha built in 1491 by the Emir of Aleppo Saif ad-Din Yalbugha al-Naseri.
Hammam al-Jawhary, hammam Azdemir, hammam Bahram Pasha, etc.

Districts and subdivisions

Old quarters around the citadel inside the walls of the ancient city:
Al-A'jam (الأعجام) district with the neighborhood of ad-Dahdileh (الدحديلة).
Altunbogha (ألتونبوغا) district with the neighborhoods of Oghlubek (أوغلبك) and Sahet al-Milh (ساحة الملح).
Aqabeh (العقبة) district with the neighborhoods of Bahsita (بحسيتا), Khan al-Harir (خان الحرير), al-Masaben (المصابن) and Jebb Asad Allah (جب أسد الله).
Bayadah (البياضة) district with the neighborhoods of Jbeileh الجبيلة, Keltawiyeh (الكلتاوية) and Mustadamiyeh (المستدامية).
Farafira (الفرافرة) district with the neighborhoods of Bandara (البندرة), Qastal Hajjarin (قسطل الحجارين), ad-Dabbagha al-Atiqa (الدباغة العتيقة), Suweiqat Ali (سويقة علي) and Suweiqat Hatem (سويقة حاتم).
Jalloum (الجلوم) district with the neighborhoods of Saffahiyeh (السفاحية), Khan al-Wazir (خان الوزير) and Souq al-Madina (سوق المدينة).
Qal'at al-Sharif (قلعة الشريف) district with the neighborhood of Tallet Alsauda (تلة السودا).
Al-Qasileh (القصيلة) district with the neighborhood of al-Hawraneh (الحورانة).
Sahet Bizzeh (ساحة بزة) district with the neighborhood of Maghazleh (المغازلة).

Old quarters outside the walls of the ancient city:

Abraj (الأبراج) district with the neighborhoods of Haret al-Pasha (حارة الباشا) and Shaker Agha (شاكر آغا).
Aghyol (أقيول) district with the neighborhood of Shmesatiyeh (الشميصاتية).
Almaji (ألمه جي) with the neighborhoods of Qastal Harami (قسطل الحرامي), Wakiliyeh (الوكيلية) and Shara'sous (شرعسوس).
Bab al-Maqam (باب المقام) district with the neighborhoods of al-Maghayer (المغاير) and Maqamat (المقامات).
Ballat (البلاط) with the neighborhoods of Qattaneh (القطانة) and Sahet Hamad (ساحة حمد).
Ad-Dallalin (الدلالين) district.
Ad-Dudu (الضوضو) with the neighborhoods of Safsafeh (الصفصافة), Jubb al-Qubbeh (جب القبة), Jubb Qaraman (جب قرمان) and Barriyet al-Maslakh (برية المسلخ).
Fardos (الفردوس) district.
Hazzazeh (الهزازة) with the neighborhoods of at-Tadribeh (التدريبة) and Zuqaq al-Arba'in (زقاق الأربعين).
Ibn Ya'qoub (ابن يعقوب) district with the neighborhoods of Banqusa (بانقوسا) and Mushatiyeh (المشاطية).
Beit Meheb district or Jdeideh quarter (بيت محب أو الجديدة) with the neighborhoods of Sissi (سيسي), Salibeh (الصليبة), Bawabet al-Qasab (بوابة القصب), Basatneh (البساتنة), al-Muballet (المبلط) and Sahet at-Tananir (ساحة التنانير).
Kallaseh (الكلاسة) district.
Muhammad Bek (محمد بك) district (also called Bab al-Nairab) with the neighborhoods of Badenjk (بادنجك), Baggara (البكارة) and Sakhaneh (السخانة).
Qadi Askar (قاضي عسكر) district with the neighborhood of Hamza Bek (حمزة بك).
Qarleq (قرلق) district.
Qastal al-Mosht (قسطل المشط) district with the neighborhoods of al-Aryan (العريان), Trab al-Ghuraba (تراب الغرباء) and Mawardi (الماوردي).
Sajlikhan (صاجليخان) district with the neighborhood of Aghajek (أغاجك).
As-Salheen (الصالحين) district.
Tatarlar (تاتارلار) district.

Preservation of the ancient city
As an ancient trading centre, Aleppo's impressive souqs, khans, hammams, madrasas, mosques and churches are all in need of more care and preservation work. After World War II, the city was significantly redesigned; in 1954 French architect André Gutton had a number of wide new roads cut through the city to allow easier passage for modern traffic. Between 1954-1983 many buildings in the old city were demolished to allow for the construction of modern apartment blocks, particularly in the northwestern areas (Bab al-Faraj and Bab al-Jinan). As awareness for the need to preserve this unique cultural heritage increased, Gutton's master plan was finally abandoned in 1979 to be replaced with a new plan presented by the Swiss expert and urban designer Stefano Bianca, which adopted the idea of "preserving the traditional architectural style of Ancient Aleppo" paving the way for prominent local activists, among them Adli Qudsi, to convince UNESCO to declare the Ancient City of Aleppo' as a World Heritage Site in 1986.

Several international institutions joined efforts with local authorities and the Aleppo Archaeological Society, to rehabilitate the old city by accommodating contemporary life while preserving the old one. The governorate and the municipality were implementing serious programmes directed towards the enhancement of the ancient city and Jdeydeh quarter.

The German Technical Cooperation (GTZ) and Aga Khan Foundation (within the frames of Aga Khan Historic Cities Programme) had a great contribution in the preservation process of the old city. The local representative of the Aga Khan Trust for Culture from 1999 until 2008 was the architect Adli Qudsi, who played a large role in the protection of the Old City from the destructive forces of urban expansion.

See also

Tourism in Syria
Al-Shibani Church
Aleppo
Aleppo Codex
Battle of Aleppo (2012–2016)
Central Synagogue of Aleppo
Dead Cities
Timeline of Aleppo history
World Heritage Sites in Danger

References

External links

3-D Old Aleppo map
Aleppo news and services (eAleppo)
Organization of World Heritage Cities
Ernst Herzfeld Papers, Series 5: Drawings and Maps, Records of Aleppo  Collections Search Center, S.I.R.I.S., Smithsonian Institution, Washington, D.C.
Louis Werner, 4000 Years Behind the Counters in Aleppo, 2004, Saudi Aramco World

World Heritage Sites in Danger
Historic sites in Syria
Neighborhoods of Aleppo
Architecture in Syria
Arabic architecture
History of Aleppo
Amorite cities